David Carruthers is a Canadian curler.

Teams

Personal life
In 2012, David Carruthers worked as an icemaker at both the Brampton and Chinguacousy curling clubs in Brampton, Ontario. He was retired in November 2017.

He is married to Gail Carruthers. He resides in Brampton, Ontario.

References

External links
 
 David Carruthers – Curling Canada Stats Archive

Living people
Canadian male curlers
Curlers from Ontario
World curling champions
Brier champions
Year of birth missing (living people)
Place of birth missing (living people)
Sportspeople from Brampton
Curling ice makers